You Meihong (born 31 January 1993 in Guangzhou, Guangdong) is a female Chinese swimmer, who competed for Team China at the 2008 Summer Olympics.

Major achievements
2008 China Open - 1st 800 m free

References
 http://2008teamchina.olympic.cn/index.php/personview/personsen/2457

External links
 

1993 births
Living people
Chinese female freestyle swimmers
Swimmers from Guangzhou
Olympic swimmers of China
Swimmers at the 2008 Summer Olympics
21st-century Chinese women